Chrząstowice may refer to the following places:
Chrząstowice, Olkusz County in Lesser Poland Voivodeship (south Poland)
Chrząstowice, Wadowice County in Lesser Poland Voivodeship (south Poland)
Chrząstowice, Opole Voivodeship (south-west Poland)